Mwayaya is an administrative ward in Buhigwe District  of Kigoma Region of Tanzania. In 2016 the Tanzania National Bureau of Statistics report there were 12,218 people in the ward, from 20,416 in 2012.

Villages / neighborhoods 
The ward has 2 villages and 8 hamlets.

 Mwayaya 
 Mwayaya
 Kaguruka
 Ruhororo
 Kibwigwa 
 Kibwigwa
 Buyanga
 Kishengezi ‘A’
 Kishengezi ‘B’
 Muyebe

References

Buhigwe District
Wards of Kigoma Region